UCHealth Poudre Valley Hospital (PVH), located in Fort Collins, Colorado, is part of UCHealth (University of Colorado Health) and serves northern Colorado, southern Wyoming, and western Nebraska. The hospital has 270 beds, and is a level III trauma center. It also houses 11 surgical suites, 12 intensive care unit beds, and a level III neonatal intensive care unit. The hospital is home to a regional orthopedic program, and many cancer treatment and rehabilitation services as well. The hospital has helped make Fort Collins a regional health center, and continues to do so, despite the 2007 opening of its sister hospital Medical Center of the Rockies in nearby Loveland.

Residency training
The hospital has an ACGME-accredited residency program in family medicine. Seven residents are accepted per year. The three-year program emphasizes community-based and rural medicine to provide physicians to northern Colorado and southern Wyoming.

Events
Poudre Valley Hospital opened in 1925 as Larimer County Hospital. It became Poudre Valley Hospital (PVH) in 1980.

Poudre Valley Hospital received attention in 1998 as the hospital where Matthew Shepard was taken after being attacked outside Laramie, Wyoming. The sudden rush of traffic to the hospital's web site required reconfiguration of the site to support the traffic.

Poudre Valley Health System, which owned PVH and Medical Center of the Rockies at the time, was named one of three winners of the 2008 Malcolm Baldrige National Quality Award. PVHS was the only healthcare provider to win the award in 2008. Vice President Joe Biden presented the Baldrige award to PVHS in Washington, D.C., on December 2.

In 2012, Poudre Valley Health System merged with the University of Colorado Hospital to form UCHealth.

References

External links
Official website

Hospital buildings completed in 1925
Buildings and structures in Fort Collins, Colorado
Hospitals in Colorado
University of Colorado
Matthew Shepard
Trauma centers